Whatever Happened to Benny Santini? is the debut album by the British singer-songwriter Chris Rea, released in 1978.

Summary
The title of the album is a reference to a name Rea's UK record label (Magnet) had considered christening him with to make him sound more attractive commercially. The album peaked at number 49 on the Billboard Hot 200, and charted for 12 weeks. It was certified a Gold album by RIAA on October 26, 1978.

The first single lifted from the album, "Fool (If You Think It's Over)", remains his biggest hit in the United States, peaking at number 12 on the Billboard Hot 100, charted for 15 weeks, and reaching number one on the Adult Contemporary Singles chart, and charting for 18 weeks. Unlike many of Rea's other singles, "Fool..." was not a great success on the UK Singles Chart, failing to chart on its first release and only reaching number 30 when re-released later in 1978 to capitalise on its US success. This success was also helped by being played extensively by Radio Caroline, as it was dedicated to the British Home Office, who were trying to put the station off the air. The following single "Whatever Happened To Benny Santini?" peaked at number 71 on the Hot 100 chart, and charted for four weeks.

Whatever Happened to Benny Santini? was produced by Gus Dudgeon, who is perhaps most famous for producing most of Elton John's album output in the 1970s. Rea was reportedly dissatisfied with the final mix of the album; he later went some way to rectify this to his satisfaction starting with 1988's greatest hits compilation New Light Through Old Windows, where "Fool..." was presented in a newly recorded version. Dudgeon went on to produce Rea's next effort, Deltics.

Track listing 
All songs by Chris Rea.
 "Whatever Happened to Benny Santini?" – 4:22
 "The Closer You Get" – 3:31
 "Because of You..." – 3:57
 "Dancing with Charlie" – 3:52
 "Bows and Bangles" – 3:58
 "Fool (If You Think It's Over)" – 4:47
 "Three Angels" – 3:26
 "Just One of Those Days" – 2:40
 "Standing in Your Doorway" – 3:53
 "Fires of Spring" – 3:54

Personnel 

 Chris Rea - vocals, acoustic, electric and slide guitar, piano, synthesizer, Wurlitzer organ, backing vocals
 Robert Ahwai - guitar
 Eddie Guy - acoustic and electric guitar
 Paul Keogh - acoustic, rhythm and electric guitar
 Phil Curtis - bass
 Pat Donaldson - bass
 Dave Markee - bass
 Eoghan O'Neill - bass
 Rod Argent - electric piano on "Whatever Happened to Benny Santini?", synthesizer on "Because of You"
 Kevin Leach - keyboards
 Max Middleton - keyboards
 Pete Wingfield - piano, electric piano, organ, harpsichord 
 Steve Gregory - soprano saxophone on "Fool (If You Think It's Over)", saxophone on "Whatever Happened to Benny Santini?"
 Dave Mattacks - drums
 Norman Nosebait - drums on "Three Angels"
 Adrian Rea - drums
 Martin Ditcham - percussion
 Gus Dudgeon - percussion, tambourine, producer
 Frank Ricotti - congas, shaker, tabla, vibraphone, tambourine, temple block, cabasa
 George Woodhead - percussion on "Fires of Spring"
 Doreen Chanter - backing vocals
 Irene Chanter - backing vocals
 Stuart Epps - backing vocals
 Pete Stanley - banjo on "Three Angels"
Richard Hewson - orchestra arranger and conductor on "Fool (If You Think It's Over)"
Technical
Phil Dunne - engineer
Stuart Epps - assistant engineer
Han-Chew Tham - cover photography

Singles 
 "Fool (If You Think It's Over)"        b/w "Midnight Love"
 "Whatever Happened to Benny Santini?"  b/w "Three Angels"

References

1978 debut albums
Chris Rea albums
Albums produced by Gus Dudgeon
Magnet Records albums
United Artists Records albums